Katherine Medina is a beauty queen who represented Colombia in Miss World 2008 in South Africa. She studied Public Accounting in school.

External links 
 Miss Colombia

1990 births
Living people
Miss World 2008 delegates
Colombian beauty pageant winners
People from Medellín